The Lada Arena is a 6,000-seat multi-purpose arena in Tolyatti, Russia. It opened in 2013, and replaced Volgar Sports Palace as the home of KHL ice hockey team, HC Lada Togliatti.  The sponsor of the arena is the car manufacturer AvtoVAZ, that is based within the city.

References

External links
Information on new arena

Indoor ice hockey venues in Russia
Indoor arenas in Russia
Sport in Tolyatti
Buildings and structures in Samara Oblast
2013 establishments in Russia
Sports venues completed in 2013